Lasse Bredekjær Andersson (born 11 March 1994) is a Danish handball player for Füchse Berlin and the Danish national team.

He played at 2013 Men's Junior World Handball Championship. Andersson's agent confirmed that his client would be leaving KIF Kolding København by the end of the 2015–16 season and moved to FC Barcelona Lassa.

Honours
KIF Kolding
 Danish Championship:
 2014, 2015
 Danish Cup:
 2013

FC BARCELONA
 Liga ASOBAL:
 2016–17, 2017–18, 2018–19, 2019–20
 Copa del Rey: 
 2016–17, 2017–18, 2018–19, 2019–20
 Copa ASOBAL:
 2016–17, 2017–18, 2018–19, 2019–20
 Supercopa ASOBAL:
 2016–17, 2017–18, 2018–19, 2019–20
 IHF Super Globe:
 2017, 2018, 2019

References

External links
 
 
 
 

1994 births
Living people
Danish male handball players
Expatriate handball players
Danish expatriate sportspeople in Germany
Danish expatriate sportspeople in Spain
FC Barcelona Handbol players
Handball-Bundesliga players
Liga ASOBAL players
KIF Kolding players
Füchse Berlin Reinickendorf HBC players
Handball players from Copenhagen
Handball players at the 2020 Summer Olympics
Medalists at the 2020 Summer Olympics
Olympic silver medalists for Denmark
Olympic medalists in handball
Olympic handball players of Denmark